Jerome Long (born April 9, 1990) is a former American football defensive tackle. He was selected in the seventh round, 218th overall, by the Kansas City Chiefs in the 2012 NFL Draft. He played college football at San Diego State where in his senior year he recorded 73 tackles and five sacks, catching the eyes of multiple NFL scouts. He is a graduate of Morro Bay High School. In high school, he wrestled in the Heavy weight class. He wrestled in the State Championship.

Professional career 
Long was drafted by the Kansas City Chiefs in the 7th round in the 2012 NFL Draft.  He was signed off the Chiefs practice squad by the Jacksonville Jaguars on December 28, 2012. He was released on April 29, 2013.  Long was then signed by the Dallas Cowboys on June 24, 2013, and was released after playing in 3 games on September 24, 2013.

References

External links
 San Diego State profile 

1990 births
Living people
American football defensive tackles
Dallas Cowboys players
Jacksonville Jaguars players
Kansas City Chiefs players
San Diego State Aztecs football players
People from Los Osos, California
Players of American football from Riverside, California